Syed Mehboob Rizwi (1911–1979) was an Indian Sunni Islamic scholar, author and historian, best known for Tarikh Darul Uloom Deoband, his two volume Urdu work on the history of Darul Uloom Deoband.

Biography
Syed Mehboob Rizwi was born in 1911 in a Rizwi Sayyid family in Deoband. He studied Islamic sciences at the Madrasa Manba-ul-Ulum Gulaothi and Darul Uloom Deoband.

Rizwi served different educational and research departments of the Darul Uloom Deoband from 1933 until he died. He was also office in-charge of seminary's record room. 

Rizwi wrote for different journals and newspapers including, Weekly Al-Jamiat, Monthly Al-Burhan, Monthly Molvi and Monthly Deen-o-Dunya of Delhi, Monthly Ma'arif, Azamgarh, Monthly Haadi, Deoband, Monthly Shams al-Mashayikh, Bhopal, Monthly Shams-ul-Islam, Amritsar  and Bi-monthly Asia, Lahore. He also wrote for the Darul Uloom, the monthly journal of Darul Uloom Deoband 

Rizwi died in 1979.

Literary works
Books include: 
Maktoobat-e-Nabvi 
Tarikh Darul Uloom Deoband (The History of Darul Uloom Deoband, translated to English by Murtaz Husain F. Quraishi).
Aab-e-ZamZam 
Makateeb-e-Hijaz
Tazkirah Saadat-e-Rizwiyyah
 Tarikh-e-Deoband

See also
 List of Indian writers
 Antony Theodore
 Tapan Kumar Pradhan
 Asghar Ali Engineer

References

Bibliography
 

1911 births
1979 deaths
Deobandis
Indian Sunni Muslim scholars of Islam
20th-century Indian historians
Indian historians of Islam